Vefa Stadı (also named Karagümrük Stadı/Arena) is a football stadium located in Fatih, Istanbul that is the home ground of Fatih Karagümrük. 

Vefa Stadı is occasionally in use for the promotional play-off encounters in lower tier leagues, other sports including American Football and for public holiday ceremonies.

History
Karagümrük Stadium was initially used as a football home ground in 1926, in the middle of a dip garden waves from Byzantium Era, called Çukurbostan in Çukurbostan district of Fatih. Stadium is constructed in Aetius Cistern, on Fevzi Paşa Caddesi , heading to Edirnekapı district of Fatih. Due to the Byzantiumeferences, the cistern is built in AD 420, by praetorian prefect Aetius during the rule of Theodosius II (reigned between 408 – 450). The cistern is 244x84 m. and 15 m. deeper than surface, surrounded by 15 m. high walls. Due to the archeological importance of the cistern, the walls had been protected at the initial stadium project.

The conversion had been started in 1926.

Renovation
The renovation of stadium has begun to be conducted in 2007, with 30.000.000 TRY grand cost, consisting 11.722 seated 3 all-covered stands (including 7.648 behind the goal, 1.024 for away side and 24 seats for visitors), one 66m2 VIP lodge, 6 normal lodges, and a 682 seats capacity VIP stand. The project also includes basketball, table tennis, and martial arts facilities.

See also
 Cistern of Aetius

References

External links

 Stadium Profile at TFF

Football venues in Turkey
Sports venues in Istanbul
Sports venues completed in 1926
Sport in Fatih